= Coltura, Switzerland =

Village in Graubünden, Switzerland

Coordinates: 46°21′N 9°34′E

Coltura is a village in Graubünden, Switzerland. It is situated at an altitude of 1,014 meters. Coltura is located near Valär and the town of Pila.
